De Wielewaal is a tower mill in Beneden-Leeuwen, Gelderland, Netherlands which was built in 1857 and is in working order. The mill is listed as a Rijksmonument.

History
De Wielewaal was built in 1857. It is similar in construction to Zeldenrust, Oss and De Nijverheid, Ravenstein. The three mills were probably built by the same millwright. In the 1930s, improvements were made to the mill. The speed of the millstones was increased by introducing smaller stone nuts. The mill was restored in 1967. In 1999, repairs were done to the sails and stage. The mill was sold to the Gemeente West Maas en Waal in 2002. It is listed as a Rijksmonument, No. 38428.

Description

De Wielewaal is what the Dutch call a "Stellingmolen". It is a six-storey tower mill with a stage. The cap is covered in dakleer. They are carried on a cast iron windshaft. The windshaft also carries the brake wheel, which has 65 cogs. This drives a wallower with 32 teeth, which is situated at the top of the upright shaft. At the bottom of the upright shaft is the great spur wheel, which has 77 cogs. This drives a pair of  diameter Cullen millstones via a lantern pinion stone nut with 22 staves and a pair of  diameter French Burr millstones via a lantern pinion stone nut with 23 staves. A 1916 Brons diesel engine drives a pair of  French Burr stones and an electric motor drives a pair of  French Burr stones.

Public access
The mill is generally open on Sunday afternoon. or by appointment.

References

Windmills in Gelderland
Windmills completed in 1857
Tower mills in the Netherlands
Grinding mills in the Netherlands
Agricultural buildings in the Netherlands
Rijksmonuments in Gelderland
1857 establishments in the Netherlands
19th-century architecture in the Netherlands